powerCON is an electrical connector manufactured by Neutrik for connecting mains power to equipment in a small space. It looks and works similarly to the Speakon connector, with the line connector inserted in the chassis connector and twisted to make contact and lock. Both line and chassis connectors are fully insulated even when disconnected.

It comes in two deliberately incompatible variants to prevent people connecting two mains supplies together. The  is blue and used for power sources (power flows out of a blue-ended cable, into a chassis socket). The  is grey and used for power drains (power flows from a chassis socket into a grey-ended cable). Couplers are available with one chassis socket of each type mounted on the ends of a plastic tube to extend cables.

Later, Neutrik introduced a larger  version of the powerCON. Unlike the  version, the  version comes in only one variant which appears to be intended for use as a source.

The main advantages of the powerCON are high current capacity in a small space (smaller than an IEC connector and double the current-carrying capacity) and locking action. The main disadvantages are cost and reliance on a single vendor. Older models are not designed to be connected/disconnected under load (which makes them unsuitable for equipment used by untrained personnel).

At the end of 2020, Neutrik released a re-designed version of the original PowerCON which is capable of connecting/disconnecting under load when mated with the corresponding connectors. Cable connectors with breaking capacity are recognizable due to the '-1' in their article number like NAC3FCA-1. Appliance connectors are recognizable due to the 'XX' added in their article number like NAC3MPXXA.

The connectors are IP65 and UL50E rated when mated (connected) together, meaning that they are designed to be used in outdoor environments with a heavy dust and/or water presence.

References

Mains power connectors